Woodbury Township may refer to:

Woodbury Township, Cumberland County, Illinois
Woodbury Township, Woodbury County, Iowa
Woodbury Township, Stutsman County, North Dakota, in Stutsman County, North Dakota
Woodbury Township, Bedford County, Pennsylvania
Woodbury Township, Blair County, Pennsylvania

See also
Woodbury (disambiguation)

Township name disambiguation pages